Bright Nights is a 2017 German drama film directed by Thomas Arslan. It was selected to compete for the Golden Bear in the main competition section of the 67th Berlin International Film Festival. At Berlin, Georg Friedrich won the Silver Bear for Best Actor award.

Cast
 Georg Friedrich as Michael
 Tristan Göbel as Luis
 Marie Leuenberger as Leyla
 Hanna Karlberg as Cecilia

References

External links
 

2017 films
2017 drama films
German drama films
2010s German-language films
2010s German films